Miss Grand USA, also referred to as Miss Grand United States or Miss Grand United States of America or Miss Grand America, is an annual female beauty pageant in the United States, founded by a Dominican-American businessperson Chantel Martínez in 2016, aiming to select the country representative for Miss Grand International, which is an annual international beauty pageant promoting World Peace and against all kinds of conflicts.

The Miss Grand USA organization has been franchising the state competitions to individual organizers since 2016, in which some cases are responsible for more than one state. Each U.S. state must choose a candidate who competes at the national Miss Grand USA pageant, however, delegates may be appointed state or regional titles if a state pageant is not offered in their area.

The United States holds a record of 4 placements at Miss Grand International, the highest position was the first place, won in 2020 by Abena Appiah of New York, followed by the fourth runner-up by Michelle León in 2016. The current Miss Grand USA is Emily DeMure of Colorado, who was expected to represent the United States at Miss Grand International 2022 in Indonesia.

Background

History
The United States has been participating at Miss Grand International since its inception in 2013.

After Chantel Martínez a New York-based Dominican-American fashion model acquired the franchise in 2016, she eventually run the first contest of Miss Grand USA to determine a winner for the international stage. The event was held at Leonard Nimoy Thalia of Symphony Space in New York City, featuring 13 national finalists, of which Michelle León from the host state was announced the winner. León also obtained the fourth runner-up title after participating in the 2016 Miss Grand International contest in Las Vegas, Nevada. Later in 2018, Martínez scheduled to organize the 2018 contest on May 28 in New York, but lost the franchise to Israel Silva and Hernan Rivera of H&I Grand Productions LLC, the Chicago-based event organizer that currently owns and runs the Miss Grand USA beauty contest since 2019.

Since its establishment, the pageant, originally programmed to be held on 31 August, was canceled once in 2020 due to the significantly increased of COVID-19 infection cases in the country, the organizer then decided to appoint a Ghanaian American model Abena Appiah to instead compete at the international stage in Thailand, where she won the contest, making her the first American representative to hold such a title and the first black contender to do so.

Location and date
The following list is the edition detail of the Miss Grand USA contest, since its inception in 2016.

Titleholders

Winner gallery

States by number of wins

National finalists
The following list is the national finalists of the Miss Grand USA pageant, as well as the competition results.
Color keys
 Declared as the winner
 Ended as a runner-up 
 Ended as a semifinalist 
 Ended as a Quaterfinalist 
 Withdrew
 Did not participate

References

External links

Official Website
 

Recurring events established in 2016
Beauty pageants in the United States